Charles Mix County is a county in the U.S. state of South Dakota. As of the 2020 United States Census, the population was 9,373. Its county seat is Lake Andes.  The county was created in 1862 and organized in 1879. It was named for Charles Eli Mix, an official of the Bureau of Indian Affairs influential in signing a peace treaty with the local Lakota Indian tribes. The easternmost approximately 60% of the county comprises the Yankton Indian Reservation.

The Papineau Trading Post, whose building is now in Geddes, South Dakota, was an early county seat.  Geddes tried to wrest the county seat from Wheeler in 1900, 1904, and 1908. The Charles Mix County Courthouse in Lake Andes was built in 1918.

Geography
Charles Mix County lies on the south line of South Dakota. Its south boundary line abuts the north boundary line of the state of Nebraska (across the Missouri River, which flows southeastward along the county's south line). A smaller drainage flows south-southwesterly to the river along the east county line, separating it from Bon Homme County. The county terrain consists of rolling hills, mostly dedicated to agriculture. The terrain drops off into the river basin along the county's southwest side, but otherwise generally slopes to the southeast.

Major highways

 U.S. Highway 18
 U.S. Highway 281
 South Dakota Highway 44
 South Dakota Highway 45
 South Dakota Highway 46
 South Dakota Highway 50
 South Dakota Highway 1804

Adjacent counties

 Brule County - northwest
 Aurora County - north
 Douglas County - northeast
 Hutchinson County - northeast
 Bon Homme County - east
 Knox County, Nebraska - southeast
 Boyd County, Nebraska - southwest
 Gregory County - west

Protected areas

 Academy Lake State Game Production Area
 Bovee Lake State Game Production Area
 Central Charles Mix State Game Production Area
 Central Platte State Game Production Area
 Dante Lake State Game Production Area
 Fuchs Waterfowl Production Area
 Gray Area State Game Production Area
 Lake Andes National Wildlife Refuge
 Lake Andes State Game Production Area
 Lake George State Game Production Area
 Missouri National Recreational River (part)
 North Point State Recreation Area
 North Wheeler State Game Production Area
 North Wheeler State Recreation Area
 Paulson State Game Production Area
 Pease Creek State Recreation Area
 Platte Creek State Recreation Area
 Raysby Waterfowl Production Area
 Red Lake State Game Production Area
 Sherman Waterfowl Production Area
 Snake Creek State Recreation Area
 Spillway State Lakeside Use Area
 Trout Waterfowl Production Area
 Tucek Waterfowl Production Area
 Turgeon State Game Production Area
 Van Zee Waterfowl Production Area
 Vanderpol Waterfowl Production Area

 West Platte State Game Production Area
 White Swan State Game Production Area
 White Swan State Lakeside Use Area
 Williamson state Game Production Area

Major lakes

 Academy Lake
 Carroll Lake
 Lake Francis Case (part)
 Goose Lake
 Lake Andes
 Lake Platte
 White Lake

Demographics

2000 census
As of the 2000 census, there were 9,350 people, 3,343 households, and 2,326 families in the county. The population density was 8 people per square mile (3/km2). There were 3,853 housing units at an average density of 4 per square mile (1/km2). The racial makeup of the county was 69.65% White, 0.13% Black or African American, 28.28% Native American, 0.10% Asian, 0.01% Pacific Islander, 0.47% from other races, and 1.37% from two or more races.  1.89% of the population were Hispanic or Latino of any race. 23.9% were of German, 10.2% Czech, 10.1% Dutch and 5.5% Norwegian ancestry.

There were 3,343 households, out of which 34.20% had children under the age of 18 living with them, 53.10% were married couples living together, 11.70% had a female householder with no husband present, and 30.40% were non-families. 28.30% of all households were made up of individuals, and 15.10% had someone living alone who was 65 years of age or older. The average household size was 2.74 and the average family size was 3.37.

The county population contained 32.00% under the age of 18, 7.10% from 18 to 24, 23.20% from 25 to 44, 20.40% from 45 to 64, and 17.30% who were 65 years of age or older. The median age was 36 years. For every 100 females there were 96.60 males. For every 100 females age 18 and over, there were 94.10 males.

The median income for a household in the county was $26,060, and the median income for a family was $30,688. Males had a median income of $24,747 versus $19,688 for females. The per capita income for the county was $11,502. About 20.80% of families and 26.90% of the population were below the poverty line, including 35.50% of those under age 18 and 21.00% of those age 65 or over.

2010 census
As of the 2010 census, there were 9,129 people, 3,249 households, and 2,222 families in the county. The racial makeup of the county was 65.0% white, 31.7% American Indian, 0.2% Asian, 0.1% black or African American, 0.3% from other races, and 2.7% from two or more races. Those of Hispanic or Latino origin made up 1.7% of the population. In terms of ancestry, 30.2% were German, 12.0% were Dutch, 11.7% were Czech, 6.8% were Norwegian, 5.1% were Irish, and 1.8% were American.

Of the 3,249 households, 33.7% had children under the age of 18 living with them, 50.0% were married couples living together, 12.9% had a female householder with no husband present, 31.6% were non-families, and 29.0% of all households were made up of individuals. The average household size was 2.63 and the average family size was 3.23. The median age was 38.2 years.

The median income for a household in the county was $35,808 and the median income for a family was $46,962. Males had a median income of $33,477 versus $25,740 for females. The per capita income for the county was $17,403. About 17.4% of families and 24.0% of the population were below the poverty line, including 32.9% of those under age 18 and 15.6% of those age 65 or over.

Communities

Reservation
Yankton Sioux Tribe

Cities

Geddes
Lake Andes (county seat)
Platte
Wagner

Towns
Dante
Pickstown
Ravinia

Census-designated place

 Clearfield Colony
 Lakeview Colony
 Marty
 Platte Colony

Townships

Bryan
Carroll
Choteau Creek
Darlington
Forbes
Goose Lake
Hamilton
Highland
Howard
Jackson
Kennedy
La Roche
Lake George
Lawrence
Lone Tree
Moore
Platte
Plain Center
Rhoda
Roe
Rouse
Signal
Waheheh
White Swan

Unorganized territory
The unorganized territory of Castalia is located in the county.

Notable residents
Ella Deloria, Yankton Dakota ethnologist
Doug Eggers, American football player
Faith Spotted Eagle, first Native American woman to receive an electoral college vote for President of the United States (2016).
Jack Sully was elected sheriff in 1872.

Politics
Charles Mix County, more akin to the Midwest than the Great Plains, up until recently favored the Democratic Party. It was one of only 130 counties nationwide to be won in 1972 by favorite son George McGovern, and it was only once carried by a Republican nominee between 1932 and 1976 – when Dwight D. Eisenhower swept every county in South Dakota in 1952. Both George W. Bush in 2000 and Donald Trump in 2016 easily exceeded the previous best Republican performance in the county.

See also
National Register of Historic Places listings in Charles Mix County, South Dakota

References

External links
 

 
South Dakota counties on the Missouri River
1879 establishments in Dakota Territory
Populated places established in 1879